Bharata Muni (Hindi: भरत मुनि) was an ancient sage who the musical treatise Natya Shastra is traditionally attributed to. The work covers ancient Indian dramaturgy and histrionics, especially Sanskrit theatre. Bharata is considered the father of Indian theatrical art forms. He is dated to between 200 BCE and 200 CE,  but estimates vary between 500 BCE and 500 CE.

The Nāṭya Śāstra is notable as an ancient encyclopedic treatise on the arts, which has influenced dance, music and literary traditions in India. It is also notable for its aesthetic "Rasa" theory, which asserts that entertainment is the desired effect of performance arts but not the primary goal and that the primary goal is to transport the individual in the audience into another parallel reality, full of wonder, where he experiences the essence of his own consciousness and reflects on spiritual and moral questions.

Natya Shastra by Bharata Muni and "Abhinaya Darpana" by Nandikeshvara are considered to be the original sources of Bharatanatyam (an Indian classical dance form).

See also
 Nava rasas
 Nandikeshvara
 Natya Shastra

References 

4.  Daumal, Rene: RASA. Essays on Indian Aesthetics & Selected Sanskrit Studies. New Directions, NYC 1982. REPR. Shivastan, Woodstock-Kathmandu, 2003 & 2006, forthcoming, Cool Grove Press, NYC.

 "Revealing the Art of Natyasastra" by Narayanan Chittoor Namboodiripad

External links
 

Indian musicologists
Indian male classical musicians
Theatrologists
Sanskrit writers
Dance education